Cherryville is an unincorporated community and former town in Clackamas County, Oregon, United States, founded in 1884.

The town population had dwindled to 50 in 1915, and the majority of the town was demolished in 1950 after the construction of the Mount Hood Highway. The Cherryville Cemetery still exists, and in 2014 was designated as a local historic site.

History
The name of the community is said to have come from the wild cherries that grew in the area. Cherryville post office was established in 1884 and closed in 1958. In 1915, Cherryville had a population of 50, a public school, and a church. Contemporarily church building is gone, but the church cemetery still exists. The majority of the town was demolished in 1950 upon the construction of the Mount Hood Highway. In 2014, the cemetery at Cherryville was formally marked and designated a local historic site.

References

Unincorporated communities in Clackamas County, Oregon
1884 establishments in Oregon
Populated places established in 1884
Ghost towns in Oregon
Unincorporated communities in Oregon